Kim Liên may refer to:

 , a ward of Đống Đa District
 , a rural commune of Kim Thành District
 Kim Liên, Nghệ An, a rural commune of Nam Đàn District
 Kim Liên Museum, a museum that was the childhood home of Ho Chi Minh